Oedipus Rex is a 1957 film, a film version of the Canadian Stratford Festival production of the William Butler Yeats adaptation of the play Oedipus Rex by Sophocles.

The actors performed wearing masks designed by Tanya Moiseiwitsch, as was the practice in Ancient Greek theatre.

Cast

Douglas Campbell as Oedipus
Eleanor Stuart as Jocasta
Robert Goodier as Creon
William Hutt as Chorus Leader
Donald Davis as Tiresias
Douglas Rain as Messenger
Tony Van Bridge as Man From Corinth
Eric House as Shepherd / Old Priest
Roland Bull as Chorus
Robert Christie as Chorus
Ted Follows as Chorus
David Gardner as Chorus
Bruno Gerussi as Chorus
Richard Howard as Chorus
Roland Hewgill as Chorus
Edward Holmes as Chorus
James Manser as Chorus
Louis Negin as Chorus 
Grant Reddick as Chorus
William Shatner as Chorus
Bruce Swerdfager as Chorus
Neil Vipond as Chorus
Gertrude Tyas as Nurse
Naomi Cameron as Ismene
Barbara Franklin as Antigone

Song
After the film was released comedic musician Tom Lehrer, noting that the film lacked a theme song "the people could hum", composed "Oedipus Rex", a satirical "theme song" for the film. The song is included on Lehrer's album An Evening Wasted With Tom Lehrer.

Reception
Theresa Loeb Cone of the Oakland Tribune praised the cast, costumes, cinematography and score, but felt that the film was "too pretentious for enjoyment".

References

External links

Canadian drama films
Canadian films based on plays
English-language Canadian films
Films based on ancient Greek plays
Films based on classical mythology
Films based on works by Sophocles
Incest in film
Patricide in fiction
Masks in theatre
Works based on Oedipus Rex
Adaptations of works by W. B. Yeats
1950s English-language films
1950s Canadian films